Blue Ridge Hall is a historic stagecoach hotel at 11593 U.S. Route 11 in central eastern Botetourt County, Virginia.  Located on the historic main road down the Shenandoah Valley, it is a two-story wood-frame structure, with a gabled roof and clapboarded exterior, and a 20th-century Colonial Revival porch across the front.  It was built about 1836, and is a well-preserved example of a Federal style antebellum house, later used as a tavern and stagecoach stop.

The property was listed on the National Register of Historic Places in 2016.

See also
National Register of Historic Places listings in Botetourt County, Virginia

References

Hotel buildings on the National Register of Historic Places in Virginia
Federal architecture in Virginia
Hotel buildings completed in 1836
National Register of Historic Places in Botetourt County, Virginia